Zhen'an County is a county in the south of Shaanxi province, China.

Administrative divisions
Zhen'an County administers 1 subdistrict, 12 towns, 2 ethnic towns, and 3 other township-level divisions.

Subdistricts 

Towns 
Zhen'an County's 12 towns are as follows:

Huilong







 





Ethnic towns 

Other township-level divisions 
Additionally, Zhen'an County administers the following three divisions which have township-level status:

 Heiyaogou Forestry Factory
 Muwang Forestry Factory
 Zhen'an County Nursery

Climate

Transportation
Zhen'an is served by the Xi'an–Ankang Railway
China National Highway 345

References

 
County-level divisions of Shaanxi
Shangluo